Raymond Marienus de Waard (born 27 March 1973 in Rotterdam) is a former professional footballer. He was a left winger well known for his pace.

De Waard began his  professional career with Excelsior Rotterdam where he played more than hundred games in three seasons before joining newly promoted Cambuur Leeuwarden in July 1999.

Towards the end of the 1999-00 season, Norwich City manager Bryan Hamilton paid £225,000 for his services.

De Waard was a disappointment for the Canaries, which was not helped by injuries and he was released by Hamilton's successor Nigel Worthington in March 2001. He returned to his native Netherlands to play for AZ Alkmaar and RBC Roosendaal. He then played at amateur clubs ASWH (2002–2003) and BVV Barendrecht.

External links
Career information at ex-canaries.co.uk

Sources
Canary Citizens by Mark Davage, John Eastwood, Kevin Platt, published by Jarrold Publishing, (2001), 

1973 births
Living people
Footballers from Rotterdam
Dutch footballers
Association football midfielders
Excelsior Rotterdam players
SC Cambuur players
Norwich City F.C. players
AZ Alkmaar players
RBC Roosendaal players
ASWH players
Dutch expatriate footballers
Expatriate footballers in England
Eredivisie players
English Football League players